Edwin Alberto Pérez León (born 28 September 1974 in Ica, Peru) is a Peruvian footballer who plays as a defensive midfielder. He currently plays for Sport Áncash in the Peruvian Segunda División.

Club career
Pérez has played for Alcides Vigo, FBC Melgar, and Cienciano. In January 2005 he transferred to Universidad San Martín de Porres. There he won back to back National Championships in the 2007 and 2008 season.

In 2009, he transferred to Sporting Cristal.

International career
Pérez has played for the Peru national football team in the 2006 FIFA World Cup qualifying rounds.

Honours

Club 
Universidad San Martín
 Peruvian First Division: 2007, 2008

References

External links

1974 births
Living people
People from Ica, Peru
People from Ica Region
Peruvian footballers
Peru international footballers
C.D. Bella Esperanza footballers
Club Alcides Vigo footballers
Coronel Bolognesi footballers
FBC Melgar footballers
Cienciano footballers
Club Deportivo Universidad de San Martín de Porres players
Sporting Cristal footballers
León de Huánuco footballers
Club Deportivo Universidad César Vallejo footballers
Sport Áncash footballers
Peruvian Segunda División players
Peruvian Primera División players
Association football midfielders